Sanders Saurajen (born 20 June 2000) is a Singaporean footballer currently playing as a goalkeeper for Geylang International.

Club

Geylang International
He made his professional debut on 9 May 2021 against Lion City Sailors in the Singapore Premier League, after being selected by head coach Noor Ali the day before the match.

Career statistics

Club

Notes

References

2000 births
Living people
Singaporean footballers
Association football goalkeepers
Singapore Premier League players
Geylang International FC players